Bhagmati was a mystic Hindu queen.

Bhagmati may also refer to:

 Bhagmati (2005 film), a 2005 Hindi film
 Bhagmati (2016 film)) or Bhaagamathie, a 2018 Indian film

See also
 Bagmati (disambiguation)